Free Country may refer to:

Free Country (TV series), 1978 American sitcom
Free Country (album), 2003 album by Joel Harrison
Free Country, USA, the fictional setting of the Homestar Runner cartoon series
Free Country (politics), description of a political concept

See also
Free speech by country